Dušan Puh (born 14 November 1951) is a Slovenian windsurfer. He competed in the Windglider event at the 1984 Summer Olympics.

References

External links
 
 

1951 births
Living people
Slovenian windsurfers
Slovenian male sailors (sport)
Olympic sailors of Yugoslavia
Sailors at the 1984 Summer Olympics – Windglider
Sportspeople from Koper
20th-century Slovenian people